The Ark-La-Tex (a portmanteau of Arkansas, Louisiana, and Texas; also stylized as Arklatex or ArkLaTex) is a socio-economic tri-state region where the Southern U.S. states of Arkansas, Louisiana, and Texas join together. The region contains portions of Northwest Louisiana, Northeast Texas, and South Arkansas as well as the extreme southeastern tip of Oklahoma, in McCurtain County (part of Choctaw Country), partly centered upon the Red River, which flows along the Texas–Oklahoma state line into Southwestern Arkansas and Northwest Louisiana.

The population estimate of the 40-county core region as of 2018 is 1,498,647 people, up from 1,043,570 in 2010. Shreveport, Louisiana, with approximately 189,149 people in 2018, is the largest city, economic and geographic center of the region, and principal hub for both the Shreveport–Bossier City metropolitan area and Northwestern Louisiana. Longview, Texas, with an approximate population of 81,647 people in 2018, is the second-largest city as well as a principal city of the Tyler–Longview metropolitan conurbation and Greater Longview metropolitan area. The twin cities of Texarkana, Texas, and Texarkana, Arkansas, are the fourth- and sixth-largest cities, respectively, but collectively make up the region's third-largest metropolitan area (with a combined population exceeding 150,000 residents) as the center of the Texarkana metropolitan area encompassing Miller County, Arkansas, and Bowie County, Texas. Other cities in the Ark-La-Tex with 20,000 or more residents include Bossier City, Louisiana; Nacogdoches, Texas; Marshall, Texas; and Ruston, Louisiana.

The counties in the area's western section are largely part of the East Texas region (except for McCurtain County, Oklahoma, which is part of the Choctaw Country tourist region) and mainly encompass the Tyler–Longview–Lufkin–Nacogdoches television market area, while the counties and parishes in the eastern half of the region are included in the Shreveport–Texarkana television market. However, some Arkansas counties—under certain, looser definitions of the Ark-La-Tex region—in northwesternmost areas of the southwestern section of the state are included in the Little Rock viewing area.

Etymology
Although use of the term to refer to the tri-state region dates back to the early 1900s, the name "Ark-La-Tex" was popularized regionally by a Shreveport Chamber of Commerce promotional campaign developed in 1932–33 to increase tourism in the area.

The campaign, dubbing the area as "The Land of Arklatex", was based on the idea that "the interests of all the people in the Tri-state area of South Arkansas, North Louisiana and East Texas are practically identical in matters pertaining to agriculture, industry, commerce and trade, and education." The region is alternatively, although seldom in most media and promotional parlance, referred to as "Arklatexoma", which more inclusively encompasses McCurtain County and other parts of extreme Southeastern Oklahoma that lie along the Red River.

Geography
Most of the Ark-La-Tex is located in the Piney Woods, an ecoregion of dense forests of mixed deciduous and conifer flora. The forests are periodically punctuated by sloughs and bayous that are linked to larger bodies of water such as Caddo Lake or the Red River. Three of the four National Forests located within the Piney Woods of East Texas are wholly or partially within the Ark-La-Tex boundaries: Angelina National Forest (spanning Angelina, Nacogdoches, San Augustine and Jasper counties), Sabine National Forest (near Hemphill) and Davy Crockett National Forest (between Lufkin and Crockett).

The Red River is the principal mainstem waterway in the region, exiting from the eastern end of Lake Texoma and running generally east along the Oklahoma–Texas border towards Southwestern Arkansas (entering it near the state line between Little River County, Arkansas, and Bowie County, Texas) before turning southward northwest of Texarkana (in so doing, forming the eastern border of Miller County) and passing into Northwestern Louisiana. The bordering Louisiana cities of Shreveport and Bossier City were developed along the river bank; its span within the Ark-La-Tex ends in Natchitoches Parish, Louisiana (where the Red River spans to the adjacent northwest of the parish's namesake county seat), at its intersection with Grant and Rapides parishes.

Definition
As with all vernacular regions, the Ark-La-Tex has no official boundaries or status and is defined differently by various sources. Most definitions of the Ark-La-Tex delineate the region as encompassing 40 parishes and counties, and most weather radars suggest a 40-county or -parish area.

Alternate definitions can include eight additional Texas counties (Lamar, Delta, Hopkins, Franklin, Wood, Smith, Cherokee, and Angelina), include the Monroe, Louisiana metropolitan area and Ouachita Parish, Louisiana (which is considered part of the Ark-La-Miss region), exclude the counties encompassing the El Dorado, Arkansas micropolitan area, or exclude McCurtain County, Oklahoma. McCurtain County is usually included in the region's areal definition, primarily for media distribution purposes, even though the Oklahoma Department of Tourism and Recreation formally defines it as being part of its Choctaw Country tourism region. Another alternate definition is solely the vicinity of the Ark-La-Tex region's three principal cities, Shreveport, Longview, and Texarkana.

Climate
The Ark-La-Tex is situated in a humid subtropical climate (Köppen climate classification Cfa) typical of the Southeastern United States, albeit occasionally interrupted by intrusions of cold air during the winter months. Portions of East Texas within the region receive more rainfall, than the rest of the state. Due to the flat topography of some areas and the prominence of smaller waterways that are prone to backwater flooding from the Red River, communities occasionally experience severe flooding events. A notable occurrence of severe flooding occurred in March 2016, after torrential rains caused a rapid rise of many local waterways, displacing upwards of 3,500 people from their homes across Caddo and Bossier parishes and adjacent areas of Northwest Louisiana that lie along the Red River. Freezing rain and ice storms occasionally occur during the winter months.

Severe thunderstorms with heavy rain, hail, damaging winds and tornadoes occur in the area during the spring and summer months, although severe weather can also occur during the winter months. The region is in the western section of the "Dixie Alley" tornado climatology region, where tornadogenesis is most often attributed by high precipitation supercell thunderstorms—within which tornadoes are often partially or fully wrapped in curtains of heavy rain, impairing them from being seen by storm spotters and chasers, law enforcement, and the public—due to an increase of moisture from proximity to the nearby Gulf of Mexico. Some areas of the region, such as Bossier City, average a slightly above normal rate of tornadoes when compared to the national average. The winter months are normally mild; Shreveport, in particular, averages 35 days of freezing or below-freezing temperatures per year. Ice and sleet storms occasionally occur during this timeframe. The summer months are hot and humid, with high to very high relative average humidity, often as a result of moisture being advected from the Gulf of Mexico; in Shreveport, maximum temperatures exceed  an average of 91 days per year.

The National Weather Service (NWS) operates a Weather Forecast Office in Shreveport, which provides local weather forecasts and warnings, watches and advisories for hazardous weather conditions for 39 counties and parishes within the greater Ark-La-Tex region.

Communities

Largest cities
List of cities with over 3,500 people:

Metropolitan and micropolitan areas

Metropolitan statistical areas

Micropolitan statistical areas

Culture
The culture of the Ark-La-Tex region, and especially its music, shows a mixture of influences from the related, but distinct, cultures of its surrounding states. The music of the area is marked by country and blues sounds typical of the music of the Southern United States, the Western music of Texas, and the well-documented music of New Orleans and Acadiana in Louisiana. The area had a significant role in the development of country and rock-and-roll music, beginning in the 1940s. On March 1, 1948, Shreveport radio station KWKH launched a country music variety show called the Ark-La-Tex Jubilee, followed a month later by the long-running and influential Louisiana Hayride program. Hayride director Horace Logan and regular performer Webb Pierce started a music publishing company called Ark-La-Tex Music. Drummer Brian Blade, a Shreveport native, included a song entitled "Ark.La.Tex." on his 2014 album Landmarks, exploring the mixture of musical influences in his home region.

Education

Colleges and universities

The region contains Stephen F. Austin State University in Nacogdoches, one of four public universities unaffiliated with any of Texas's six university systems, and Louisiana Tech University, a public research university in Ruston, which are the largest public institutions of higher education in the Ark-La-Tex. Named after Stephen F. Austin, who led the second and most successful colonization of the region that would become the state of Texas through the migration of 300 families from other parts of the United States in 1825, the former of the two major universities was founded as a teachers' college in 1923 as a result of legislation authored by State Senator Wilfred Roy Cousins, Sr. Louisiana Tech opened in 1894 (as the Industrial Institute and College of Louisiana) to provide educational subjects pertaining to the arts and sciences for the development of an industrial economy in Louisiana post-Reconstruction. In the 1960s the school (then named Louisiana Polytechnic Institute) became desegregated, and allowed integrated classes with white and black students; after it achieved criteria of a research university under the leadership of President F. Jay Taylor, the university officially adopted its current name in 1970. Louisiana Tech also operates a satellite campus in Shreveport as well as classes at the Academic Success Center and Barksdale Air Force Base Instructional Site in Bossier City, and at the CenturyLink corporate headquarters in Monroe. Ruston is also home to a branch campus of Monroe-based Louisiana Delta Community College.

The Shreveport–Bossier City area is home to several colleges; among them, the Methodist-affiliated Centenary College of Louisiana (originally founded in the East Feliciana Parish town of Jackson in 1825, eventually relocating to Shreveport in 1908), Louisiana Baptist University and Theological Seminary (founded in 1973), Louisiana State University Health Sciences Center Shreveport (opened in 1969 as the only medical school in northern Louisiana) and one of the largest nursing schools in northern Louisiana, the Northwestern State University College of Nursing (opened in 1949) as well as satellite campuses of Louisiana State University (opened as a two-year institution in 1967, and expanded into a four-year college in 1976), Southern University (opened in 1967 with a two-year associate's degree program). Longview, Texas, is home to LeTourneau University, a private, four-year Christian university founded by R.G. LeTourneau in 1946, originally as LeTourneau Technical Institute. Inclusively, Tyler, Texas is also home to satellite higher education campuses through the University of Texas System by way of the University of Texas at Tyler (opened in 1971 as Tyler State College) and the University of Texas Health Center at Tyler (opened in 1947 as the East Texas Tuberculosis Sanitarium and chartered into The University of Texas System in 1977 by the system's Board of Regents) as well as one of two independent institutions, Tyler Junior College (opened in 1926).

The Texarkana metropolitan area is home to Texas A&M University–Texarkana, a four-year satellite branch of the Texas A&M University System (founded as an upper-level extension college of East Texas State University in 1971), and Texarkana College (a public community college formed in 1927 as a branch of the Texarkana Independent School District and separated into an independent institution via a public vote in 1941). Arkadelphia is home to two liberal arts institutions: Henderson State University (founded in 1890 as Arkadelphia Methodist College), which is the only member of the Council of Public Liberal Arts Colleges based in Arkansas and announced plans to join the Arkansas State University System in October 2019, and Ouachita Baptist University, a private, Baptist college affiliated with the Arkansas Baptist State Convention (opened in 1886).

The area also houses several historically black colleges and universities (HBCU). The largest of these, Grambling State University, located in the namesake Lincoln Parish town of Grambling ( west of the Louisiana Tech University campus), was founded in 1901 as the Colored Industrial and Agricultural School. The university was created out of the desire of African-American farmers in rural areas of northern Louisiana to educate other black residents in that section of the state; it moved to its present location in 1905 (as the North Louisiana Agricultural and Industrial School) and became a state junior college (renamed the Louisiana Negro Normal and Industrial Institute) by 1928, when it began offering two-year professional certificates and diplomas to graduates. Grambling received accreditation by the Southern Association of Colleges and Schools (SACS) in 1949. Other HBCUs in the region include Texas College in Tyler (opened in 1894), Jarvis Christian College in Hawkins (a Christian-based HBCU founded in 1912), and Wiley College in Marshall (a private liberal arts college founded in 1873 by Methodist Episcopal Church Bishop Isaac Wiley and certified in 1882 by the Freedman's Aid Society, which is one of the oldest predominantly black colleges west of the Mississippi River).

Media

Newspapers
 Athens Daily Review – Athens (Daily, except Sundays and Mondays)
 Bossier Press-Tribune – Bossier City (Bi-weekly)
 The Daily Sentinel – Nacogdoches (Daily/Morning)
 Longview News-Journal – Longview (Daily)
 Lufkin Daily News – Lufkin (Daily)
 Marshall News Messenger – Marshall (Daily/Morning)
 McCurtain County Gazette – Idabel (Daily/Morning)
 Natchitoches Times – Natchitoches (Daily/Morning)
 Ruston Daily Leader – Ruston (Daily, except Saturdays)
 Texarkana Gazette – Texarkana, AR (Daily/Morning)
 The Times – Shreveport (Daily/Morning)
 Tyler Morning Telegraph – Tyler (Daily/Morning)

TV

Radio

AM stations

FM stations

Transportation

Airports
Shreveport Regional Airport (IATA: SHV; ICAO: KSHV), located off Hollywood Avenue in southwestern Shreveport, is the region's primary commercial airport. Established in 1952, Shreveport Regional is served by Allegiant Air (with flights to McCarran International Airport in Las Vegas and Orlando Sanford International Airport), American Airlines (to Dallas/Fort Worth International Airport), Delta Air Lines (to Hartsfield–Jackson Atlanta International Airport), GLO Airlines (to Louis Armstrong New Orleans International Airport), and United Airlines (as United Express, to George Bush Intercontinental Airport in Houston and Denver International Airport). Shreveport Downtown Airport (IATA: DTN; ICAO: KDTN), built in 1931 and located north of downtown Shreveport along the Red River, is the city's general aviation airport and also serves as a reliever airport for Shreveport Regional Airport, itself built to replace the Downtown Airport as Shreveport's main commercial airport due to the limited growth that could be made to that facility due to its close proximity of the Red River.

General and limited commercial aviation is additionally available at several smaller airfields in the Ark-La-Tex; Tyler Pounds Regional Airport (IATA: TYR; ICAO: KTYR), a city-owned public use airport in Tyler; offers service to and from Dallas/Fort Worth International and, on a seasonal basis, Denver International, respectively, via American Eagle and Frontier Airlines.

Major highways
The Ark-La-Tex is an integral point on the United States Interstate Network, with three major interstate highways—Interstate 20, Interstate 30, and Interstate 49—servicing the region, connecting five of the region's largest cities, Tyler, Longview, Marshall, Shreveport and Bossier City. Interstates 20 and 49—the latter of which has its northern terminus at the intersection of the former of the two Interstates—bisect Shreveport, intersecting with I-220 and LA Highway 3132 (which both serve as bypass routes connecting the northern and southern parts of Shreveport) on the city's west side, with U.S. 171 in downtown Shreveport, and with I-220 in central Bossier Parish (north of Barksdale Air Force Base, at which point it begins sharing an overlap with U.S. 71 as it traverses eastward towards Monroe).

The region is a point within the planned extension of the otherwise presently disjointed Interstate 69. A branch of the Interstate (I-369) presently runs north on U.S. 59 within Texas from Tenaha to Texarkana, where the span will eventually connect to Interstates 30 and 49. In response to widespread opposition from environmental groups and property rights activists, the Texas Department of Transportation (TxDOT) announced in June 2008 that it would complete I-69 through upgrades to the existing spans of U.S. 59, U.S. 77 and U.S. 281 to Interstate standards through rural areas, with bypasses around urban centers along the route, which will be financed through private sector investment. An approximately  portion of the I-69 extension to extend from south of Clarksdale, Mississippi, to the Louisiana/Texas state line will be built as a new-terrain route that parallels existing U.S. and state highways in some areas. One of the current segments, SIU 16, covers areas of East Texas to the northeast of Nacogdoches, extending until it terminates at U.S. 171 near Stonewall. Another segment, SIU 15, continues over the southern and eastern sections of Shreveport, crossing I-49 and ending at I-20 near Haughton. The third existing segment, SIU 14, extends northeast from I-20 to US 82 near El Dorado, Arkansas.

River transportation
River transportation is available through two inland multi-modal transportation and distribution centers along the Red River: the  Port of Caddo-Bossier, located at the head of navigation on the J. Bennett Johnston Waterway ( south of Shreveport on LA Highway 1), and the  Natchitoches Parish Port, located on Louisiana Highways 6 and 486 (U.S. 71/U.S. 84) in Campti, Louisiana on the only slack water port on the Red River. The Port of Caddo-Bossier began loading its first cargo in 1995, and has received more than nine million tons of barge freight and over eight million tons of rail freight. The port—which houses more than 17 freight and shipping companies—links the Ark-La-Tex to domestic and international markets via the Mississippi River, and the Gulf Intracoastal Waterway. Bossier City hosts three riverboat casino gambling resorts along the east bank of the Red River: Margaritaville Resort Casino, Horseshoe Bossier City, and Boomtown Bossier City.

Notable people

Notes

References

 
Regions of the United States
Regions of Louisiana
Regions of Texas
Regions of Arkansas
Geography of Shreveport, Louisiana
Red River of the South
Texarkana